"Plastorhodobacter" is a Gram-negative and aerobic genus of bacteria from the family of Rhodobacteraceae with one known species ("Plastorhodobacter daqingensis"). "Plastorhodobacter daqingensis" has been isolated from the Daqing Oilfield in China.

References

Rhodobacteraceae
Bacteria genera
Monotypic bacteria genera